Poe-Land: The Hallowed Haunts of Edgar Allan Poe is a book written by J.W. Ocker and published by Countryman Press (owned by W. W. Norton & Company) on 6 October 2014 which later went on to win the Edgar Award for Best Critical / Biographical Work in 2015.

References

External links 
 As listed on AbeBooks
 Poe-land : the hallowed haunts of Edgar Allan Poe, J.W. Ocker

Edgar Award-winning works
American biographies